Mowgli: Legend of the Jungle (also known and stylized on screen simply as Mowgli) is a 2018 adventure drama film directed by Andy Serkis with a screenplay by Callie Kloves, based on stories collected in All the Mowgli Stories by Rudyard Kipling. The film stars Rohan Chand, Matthew Rhys, and Freida Pinto, along with voice and motion capture performances from Christian Bale, Cate Blanchett, Benedict Cumberbatch, Naomie Harris, and Serkis. In the film, an orphaned human boy who was raised by wolves, sets out on a journey to find a human village while evading Shere Khan.

Talks of a new Jungle Book film from Warner Bros. Pictures began in 2012 and various directors, including Steve Kloves, Ron Howard, and Alejandro González Iñárritu, were approached before Serkis was confirmed in March 2014. Much of the cast signed on that August and principal photography began in March 2015. Filming took place in South Africa and at Warner Bros. Studios in Leavesden, England.

Originally scheduled to be released in October 2016 by Warner Bros. Pictures, the film was delayed numerous times to work on the visual effects and to create space between itself and the April 2016 release of Walt Disney Pictures' own Jungle Book adaptation. In July 2018, Warner Bros. Pictures sold the rights for the film to Netflix. The film was released in select theaters on 29 November 2018, followed by its subsequent digital Netflix release on 7 December 2018. It received mixed reviews from critics, who praised the cast, visual effects, and Serkis' direction, but many compared it unfavorably to the Disney film and criticized the uneven tone, calling it a "messy—if ambitious—misfire".

Plot

In a jungle in India, the giant Indian python seer Kaa watches as Shere Khan, a treacherous Bengal tiger, breaks 'jungle law' by killing a family of humans. Bagheera, a panther, finds a surviving infant boy and takes him to Nisha and Vihaan's family of Indian wolves. Tabaqui, Shere Khan's hyena lackey, spots the boy before being chased away. The 'man-cub' is brought before the wolf council, where Bagheera buys the boy's life with a kill and strong-arms Baloo, a Himalayan brown bear, into serving as his fellow guardian. Shere Khan arrives to kill the child, but Akela, leader of the wolf pack, declares that the boy is under the pack's protection. Shere Khan warns that when Akela misses his prey, the tiger will return to kill the boy.

The child, known as Mowgli, is adopted by Nisha and raised with the wolves. Years pass, and Mowgli encounters Shere Khan, who has antagonized the nearby 'man-village' by breaking jungle law—killing the villagers’ cattle. Mowgli falls into a tiger trap set by the village, but is saved by Hathi, an Indian elephant missing half a tusk. Bagheera reveals to Mowgli that he is human, but Mowgli is determined to complete 'the Running', the test to earn full membership in the pack. Bagheera urges Mowgli to leave the jungle for the village, where he will be safe from Shere Khan. Watching the village from afar, Mowgli learns of the existence of fire.

During the Running, as Bagheera chases the young wolves, Mowgli uses his ability to climb and run upright to gain the lead. Desperate to keep him safe from Shere Khan, Bagheera unfairly foils Mowgli in his quest to pass the Running. Bagheera is confronted by Baloo, but Bagheera caught Mowgli during the test, so Mowgli has failed and is soon to be excluded by the pack.

Soon, Mowgli is kidnapped by the Bandar-log tribe of monkeys and brought to Shere Khan. The tiger scars the unconscious boy, but before he can kill Mowgli, Baloo and Bagheera arrive to save him. The rescue is short-lived, as the two are quickly overwhelmed by the monkeys. Mowgli is then rescued by Kaa, who scares away the monkeys.

After Baloo heals him, Bhoot, the albino runt of the wolf cubs, attempts to make Mowgli feel better, but Mowgli angrily rebukes him, sending Bhoot running away in tears just as Mowgli regrets his remarks. Later, Mowgli confronts Kaa at her lair on why she saved him. As she slithers around him, Kaa explains that Shere Khan has brought the wrath of man into the jungle by killing their cattle and believes Mowgli, being a creature of two worlds, can restore harmony.

While hunting, the aging Akela fails to bring down his prey, leading Shere Khan to remind the pack they must challenge Akela for the role of leader. As the wolves fight, Mowgli is desperate to find a way to save Akela. He runs down to the man-village, steals a burning branch, and not aware that using man-tools (such as fire) is forbidden, he quickly repels Shere Khan and the challengers. But by using fire he has shamed himself, in Akela's eyes, and Mowgli is banished. The feral Mowgli goes to the man-village, where he is captured and locked up by the villagers and John Lockwood, a British hunter. Bagheera visits Mowgli to tell him that he must stay with the villagers and gain their trust, as Bagheera did to escape captivity when he was young.

Mowgli slowly comes to enjoy life in the village, cared for by the kindly Messua and learning hunting skills from Lockwood, who is tracking Shere Khan. Mowgli's wolf-sibling Gray Brother secretly visits Mowgli and informs him that Shere Khan has driven away all the wolves loyal to Akela and continues to kill cattle, which threatens all the jungle's animals with the village's wrath. But Mowgli refuses to help.

While the village celebrates Holi, Mowgli learns that it was Lockwood who shot off Hathi's tusk and discovers his hunting trophies, including the head of Bhoot, the latter particularly traumatizes the boy. Mowgli returns the tusk to Hathi, offering him the hunter in exchange for ridding the jungle of Shere Khan.

Mowgli meets with Baloo, Bagheera, and the wolf pack, who refuse to go against jungle law to defeat Shere Khan. Unafraid, Mowgli lures Shere Khan to the edge of the village, where the tiger is surrounded by the elephant herd loyal to Hathi. Shere Khan and Mowgli battle, and Mowgli is able to wound Shere Khan severely. Alerted by the sounds of the battle, Mowgli's wolf-family and friends, ashamed for how they've treated him, rush to his aide. A drunken Lockwood shoots at Shere Khan but wounds Mowgli instead. Before Lockwood can cause more harm, he is killed by Hathi. As the battle continues, Akela sacrifices himself to save Mowgli. With his dying breath, Akela names Mowgli as his successor. With Messua and the village watching, Mowgli returns to the jungle, and the mortally-wounded Shere Khan makes one last attempt to kill Mowgli. Mowgli protects himself, and then slays the tiger.

Kaa explains that Mowgli has given the animals a voice and brought peace to the jungle.

Cast

 Rohan Chand as Mowgli, a plucky and kind boy who is raised by wolves.
 Matthew Rhys as John Lockwood, a colonial hunter who hunts for trophies and comes to hunt Shere Khan.
 Freida Pinto as Messua, an altruistic woman who takes in Mowgli.

Voice and motion-capture
 Christian Bale as Bagheera, a wise black panther who is Mowgli's protector, one of his teachers and was born in human custody.
 Andy Serkis as Baloo, a firm but fair Himalayan brown bear who is one of Mowgli's teachers.
 Benedict Cumberbatch as Shere Khan, a barbaric and sadistic Bengal tiger with a crippled front leg who is Mowgli's archenemy and the one who slew his biological parents.
 Cate Blanchett as Kaa, an enormous Indian Python who is the jungle's seer, one of Mowgli's mentors, possible admirer and the narrator of the film.
 Tom Hollander as Tabaqui, a deranged striped hyena who is Shere Khan's follower.
 Peter Mullan as Akela, an elderly Indian wolf who is the chief and leader of his pack.
 Naomie Harris as Nisha, an Indian wolf who is Mowgli's adopted mother.
 Eddie Marsan as Vihaan, an Indian wolf who is Mowgli's adopted father.
 Jack Reynor as Gray Brother, an Indian wolf who is the oldest and most loyal of Mowgli's adopted brothers.
 Louis Ashbourne Serkis as Bhoot, an albino Indian wolf cub in Akela's pack and Mowgli's friend.

Production
A number of writers, directors, and producers were connected with the film during its development. In April 2012, Warner Bros. Pictures announced that it was developing the film with Steve Kloves in talks to write, direct, and produce it. It was reported in December 2013 that Kloves would produce the film, and Alejandro González Iñárritu was in talks to direct, from a screenplay by Kloves' daughter Callie. However, in January 2014, Iñárritu left the project due to scheduling conflicts with Birdman and The Revenant. In February 2014, it was reported that Ron Howard was in talks to direct, and would produce the film with Brian Grazer through their Imagine Entertainment company. The next month it was announced that Andy Serkis would direct and produce the film with collaborator Jonathan Cavendish of The Imaginarium, and Serkis would also perform the role of Baloo. Production designer Gary Freeman, editor Mark Sanger, and costume designer Alexandra Byrne were hired.

In August 2014, Benedict Cumberbatch joined the film to voice the villain role of Shere Khan. Christian Bale, Cate Blanchett, Naomie Harris, Tom Hollander, Eddie Marsan, Peter Mullan, and Rohan Chand were announced the following day. Jack Reynor was added to the cast in March 2015 as Mowgli's Brother Wolf. It was announced in April 2015 that Matthew Rhys was in talks to play the human role of John Lockwood. In May 2015, it was reported that Freida Pinto would be playing an unspecified live-action role along with Rhys and Chand, later confirmed to be Mowgli's adoptive mother.

Principal photography began on 9 March 2015. It was filmed in South Africa and at Warner Bros. Studios, Leavesden in England.

Release
The film, originally titled Jungle Book: Origins, was initially set for an October 2016 release by Warner Bros. In December 2014, Warner Bros. shifted the date to October 2017, allowing more time for further work on the visual effects. In April 2016, just before the wide release of Disney's The Jungle Book, the film's release date was moved to 19 October 2018. In October 2017, Andy Serkis revealed the working title of the film to be Mowgli: Tales from the Jungle Book. In December, the official title was changed to Mowgli. Serkis stated that the film would be "darker" and more "serious" in tone than previous Jungle Book adaptations, thus closer to that of Kipling's original works. In March 2018, Serkis said first footage would be released "very soon." The first trailer and a behind-the-scenes featurette premiered on 21 May 2018.

In July 2018, it was announced that Netflix had purchased the worldwide distribution rights of the film from Warner Bros., and would set a 2019 release date, including a theatrical 3D release. At the time of the announcement, Deadline Hollywood described the film as "over-baked and over-budget" and said it allowed Warner Bros. to avoid "Pan-like box office bomb headlines" and saved them millions of dollars for not needing to promote the film. Speaking of the move, Serkis stated: 

On 7 November 2018, Netflix released a new trailer for the film, announcing a new title change, Mowgli: Legend of the Jungle, as well as its limited theatrical release on 29 November 2018, and its subsequent streaming release on 7 December 2018. The film had its world premiere in Mumbai on 25 November 2018, the first time a Hollywood film premiered in India.

Reception
The website's critical consensus reads, "Mowgli: Legend of the Jungle brings impressive special effects to bear on the darker side of its classic source material, but loses track of the story's heart along the way." On Metacritic, the film has a weighted average score of 51 out of 100, based on 22 critics, indicating "mixed or average reviews".

Kate Erbland of IndieWire gave the film a "C+" and wrote: "Too dark for kids, too tame for adults. Stunning effects, occasionally wretched motion-capture. The technology may be there, but that doesn't mean it's been utilized to its full, feeling powers. It's a coming-of-age story unable to push forward in all the ways that really matter." Similarly, The Atlantic reviewer David Sims claimed the film suffers from weak visual effects and bland story.

Matt Zoller Seitz of RogerEbert.com awarded Mowgli two stars, criticizing the film's motion capture effects and comparing the film unfavorably to Favreau's The Jungle Book. Olly Richards of Empire gave the film 2/5 stars, writing that "for all his ambition, Serkis can't find the right tone for Mowgli and it becomes a very confused beast, neither fun enough for all ages to enjoy nor complex enough to be the visceral, grown-up thriller he nudges at." The Observer reviewer Wendy Ide awarded the film 3/5 stars, praising the film's visual and technical effects but opining that there was too much trauma and animal violence to attract family audiences.

David Fear of Rolling Stone gave the film 3/5 stars, describing Mowgli as "a harsher, darker, more CGI-heavy look at 'The Jungle Book'." While criticizing the film's CGI effects, Fear praised Christian Bale, Andy Serkis, Benedict Cumberbatch, and Cate Blanchett for their voicework as Bagheera, Baloo, Shere Khan, and Kaa. Michael Sullivan of The Washington Post awarded the film 4/5 stars, praising Andy Serkis for combining motion capture animation with live action footage while cautioning parents not to watch it with their kids due to its adult themes and violence. Additionally, Robert Abele of the Los Angeles Times praised Mowgli for incorporating the darker and more mature elements of Kipling's The Jungle Book; also favorably comparing the film to Disney's two family friendly Jungle Book iterations and describing Mowgli as "the movie equivalent of a whiskey chaser after a sugary shake."

Rohan Naahar of the Hindustan Times awarded Mowgli 4/5 stars, praising Serkis for delivering "a nuanced, visually dazzling update of the Jungle Book for Netflix." While praising the film for its technical effects and mature themes, Naahar expressed disappointment with the under-representation of Indians in the main cast apart from Freida Pinto. Collider Matt Goldberg described the film as a "blood-soak version of the Jungle Book." Goldberg criticized the film's level of violence and unsatisfactory CGI effects, giving the film a D rating.

References

External links
  on Netflix
 
 

2018 films
2010s adventure drama films
American adventure drama films
British adventure drama films
Films about animals
Films about children
Films about interracial romance
Films about orphans
Films directed by Andy Serkis
Films produced by Steve Kloves
Films set in the 1850s
Films set in Asia
Films set in the British Raj
Films set in India
Films shot in Hertfordshire
Films shot in London
Films shot in South Africa
Films shot at Warner Bros. Studios, Leavesden
Jungle adventure films
The Jungle Book films
Films using motion capture
English-language Netflix original films
Warner Bros. films
2018 drama films
Films about tigers
Films with live action and animation
2010s English-language films
2010s American films
2010s British films